Avan Varunnu is a 1954 Indian Malayalam-language film, directed by M. R. S. Mani and produced by M. Kunchacko. The film stars Prem Nazir and Kumari Thankam. The film had musical score by V. Dakshinamoorthy.

Cast
 Prem Nazir
 Muthukulam Raghavan Pillai
 Boban Kunchacko
 Adoor Pankajam
 Ambalappuzha Rajamma
 B. S. Saroja
 Kalaikkal Kumaran
 Kottarakkara Sreedharan Nair
 Kumari Thankam
 Mathappan
 S. P. Pillai
 Subrani
 Vanakkutty
 C. R. Rajakumari

References

External links
 

1954 films
1950s Malayalam-language films